Callidium californicum is a species of beetle in the family Cerambycidae. It was described by Casey in 1912.

References

Callidium
Beetles described in 1912